Nooitgedacht is a smock mill in  Veenoord, Drenthe, in the Netherlands, which has been restored to working order. The mill was built (in its current location) in 1916 and is listed as a Rijksmonument, number 33786.

History
In 1862, a corn and barley mill was moved from Vlagtwedde and rebuilt close to the site of the present mill for miller Johannes van Aalst. This mill burnt down in 1904. To replace it, an oil mill was moved from Mensingeweer by millwright Van Ausselt. This mill was struck by lightning and burnt down in 1916. Van Ausselt and millwright Huberts, from Coevorden, moved a mill from Hankate, Overijssel, to replace it. This was the third move for that mill, which was originally built in 1732 as a barley mill at Leeuwarden, Friesland. By 1749 it was also an oil mill. It was moved between 1786 and 1805 to Heerenveen, Friesland, where it was known as Het Fortuin (English: The Fortune). In 1892 it was moved to Hankate, where the mill was known as the Molen van Kappert. The mill was worked until at least 1952, when it was sold to the Instituut voor de Landbouw. In 1973 it was transferred to De Hollandsche Molen and later still to Stichting Drentse Molens (English: Drenthe Mills Society).

Description

Nooitgedacht is what the Dutch describe as an "achtkante stellingmolen". It is a two-storey smock mill with a stage on a three-storey brick base. The smock and cap are thatched. The mill is winded by a tailpole and winch. The windshaft also carries the brake wheel which has 73 cogs. This drives the wallower (48 cogs) at the top of the upright shaft. At the bottom of the upright shaft, the great spur wheel, which has 92 cogs, drives the  diameter French Burr stones via a lantern pinion stone nut with 20 staves.

Millers
Johannes van Aalst (1916– )
B H van Aalst (1940–52)

Reference for above:

Public access
Nooitgedacht is open to the public on Saturdays and when the mill is turning.

References

External links
Website Nooitgedacht

Windmills in Drenthe
Windmills completed in 1916
Smock mills in the Netherlands
Octagonal buildings in the Netherlands
Rijksmonuments in Drenthe
Buildings and structures in Emmen, Netherlands